Edward Kirk may refer to:
 Edward N. Kirk (1828–1863), Civil War Union general
 Edward Norris Kirk (1802–1874), Presbyterian pastor